Hickory Hill is an unincorporated community in Cole County, in the U.S. state of Missouri.

History
Hickory Hill was laid out in 1867, and named for the hickory trees near the elevated town site. The Hickory Hill post office closed in 1912.

References

Unincorporated communities in Cole County, Missouri
Unincorporated communities in Missouri
Jefferson City metropolitan area